Soumitra Bannerjee (1954— 8 January 2000) was an Indian actor who worked mainly in Bengali cinema. Some of his notable films are Amar Prem, Troyee, Guru Dakshina, IndrajIt, Bhoy, and Badnam. He is best known for playing villainous roles.  He is famous for the quote Maaltake Garite Tol from Nawab.

Biography 
Soumitra Bannerjee was born in an aristocrat Zamindar family (Banerjee family of Damdama at Pandua, Hooghly). He was multitalented from his childhood. He began his career at the age of eight in Subha O Debotar Grash in 1964 and eventually appeared in about 150 films. In 1982 he was cast in the lead role in the movie Troyee opposite Debashree Roy and Mithun Chakraborty. The movie become a hit and he began to receive offers from directors afterwards. Despite his desire to play the protagonist, he soon became a typecast in negative roles, especially in the role of a spoilt son of a wealthy father. He has worked many successful movies as an antagonist.

Soumitra Banerjee died on 8 January 2000. His last film was Khelaghar.
Sarod maestro, music director and writer Abanindra Maitra was his nearest friend, they grew up together since childhood. He gave music in many of his films like Debotar Grash, Jeeban Sangra and others.
Abanindra said Soumitra was a highly talented actor and a singer.

Filmography

Death 
He died in 2000 due to alcoholism. He was survived by his wife.

References

External links

Bengali actors
Indian actors
1954 births
2000 deaths
Indian male film actors
Male actors in Bengali cinema
People from Hooghly district